Valentim is both a Portuguese surname and a given name. Notable people with the name include:

Surname
Evangelino Valentim (born 1984), Nigerian footballer
Valentim (footballer) (born 1977), full name Francisco de Assis Clarentino Valentim, Brazilian footballer
Othon Valentim Filho (born 1944), Brazilian footballer
Paulo Valentim (1932–1984), Brazilian footballer
Paulo Valentim (guitarist), Portuguese guitarist
Rubem Valentim (1922–1991), Brazilian artist

Given name
Valentim Amões (died 2008), Angolan politician
Valentim Fernandes, Portuguese printer
Valentim Loureiro (born 1938), Portuguese politician

See also
Valentim Gentil, a municipality in São Paulo, Brazil
São Valentim, a municipality in Rio Grande do Sul, Brazil
Valentim de Carvalho, a Portuguese record label

Portuguese-language surnames